.sh is the Internet country code top-level domain (ccTLD) for the British Overseas Territory of Saint Helena, Ascension and Tristan da Cunha, although it is primarily used in Saint Helena (Ascension Island has its own ccTLD, .ac). Registrations of internationalized domain names are also accepted.

On 22 February 2010 the ISO 3166-1 code for Saint Helena, Ascension and Tristan da Cunha changed to reflect the SH used for the ccTLD.

Second level domains
There are seven second level domains:

 co.sh – commercial entities
 com.sh – commercial entities
 org.sh – non-profit organizations
 gov.sh – government departments and agencies
 edu.sh – educational institutions
 net.sh – network service providers
 nom.sh – non-island Internet sites

Top-level domains
A majority of sites under the .sh domain have nothing to do with Saint Helena, Ascension or Tristan da Cunha.

Members of DeviantArt are able to go to their "stash," a service where digital media can be uploaded, stored and published.  The DeviantArt "stash" uses the .sh top level domain sta.sh.

Ian Hecox and Anthony Padilla use the smo.sh domain name to link to addresses on their website, smosh.com from their YouTube channel, Smosh.

Skillshare uses the domain hack skl.sh to redirect to their website.

Since the .sh filename extension is also used by Unix shell scripts, this domain has been used for websites about command-line interface programs such as Homebrew.

SH is the official abbreviation for the German federal state of Schleswig-Holstein and the .sh domain is used for sites like nah.sh, a public transportation site as well as the Verbraucherzentrale (verbraucherzentrale.sh), the SPD party (spd.sh) and for some subpages by the official Schleswig-Holstein government (e.g. wahlen.sh).

The rhythm game osu! and the personal landing page of its primary developer uses the ppy.sh domain, such as osu.ppy.sh or old.ppy.sh, and ppy.sh.

The main fork of the popular movie torrent freeware program Popcorn Time is hosted at a .sh domain.

See also
 .uk
 .ac

References

External links
 IANA .sh whois information
 Official .sh web hosting company.

Computer-related introductions in 1997
Country code top-level domains
Economy of Saint Helena
Council of European National Top Level Domain Registries members

sv:Toppdomän#S